is a Japanese former professional tennis player.

Born in Fukuyama, Miyachi was a World Youth Cup (Junior Davis Cup) representative for Japan in 1990, securing a win over future world number one Marcelo Ríos.

While competing on the professional tour, Miyachi reached a career high singles ranking of 303 in the world. He participated in the qualifying draw of the Australian Open on three occasions. His best performance on the ATP Tour came at the 1995 Japan Open, where he had wins over David Pate and Stephen Noteboom, to make the round of 16.

Miyachi was a singles bronze medalist at the 1995 Summer Universiade.

References

External links
 
 
 

1974 births
Living people
Japanese male tennis players
People from Fukuyama, Hiroshima
Universiade medalists in tennis
Universiade bronze medalists for Japan
Medalists at the 1995 Summer Universiade
20th-century Japanese people